Parelliptis is a genus of moth in the family Lecithoceridae.

Species
 Parelliptis librata Meyrick, 1910
 Parelliptis scytalias Meyrick, 1910
 Parelliptis sporochlora (Meyrick, 1929)

References

Natural History Museum Lepidoptera genus database

 
Lecithocerinae
Moth genera